Red Widow is an American drama television series created by Melissa Rosenberg, starring Radha Mitchell and Goran Visnjic. On May 11, 2012, ABC picked up Red Widow as a series. The series ran from March 3 to May 5, 2013 and aired on Sundays. The series is based on a 2010 Dutch drama series titled Penoza created by Pieter Bart Korthuis and Diederik van Rooijen.

On May 10, 2013, ABC canceled the series after one season.

Overview
The series stars Radha Mitchell as Marta Walraven, a housewife from Northern California whose husband, a marijuana smuggler, was killed. She has to continue his work to protect her family.

Cast and characters
 Radha Mitchell as Marta Walraven (née Petrova), housewife and widow of Evan Walraven, a marijuana smuggler
 Goran Visnjic as Nicholae Schiller, San Francisco's premier crime boss and the man to whom Marta owes money
 Clifton Collins Jr. as James Ramos, the FBI agent assigned to Marta's case
 Rade Šerbedžija as Andrei Petrov, Marta's father, an organized crime boss in the Richmond and a rival of Schiller
 Luke Goss as Luther, one of Andrei's trusted men
 Jaime Ray Newman as Katrina "Kat" Petrova, Marta's and Irwin's sister
 Wil Traval as Irwin Petrov, Marta and Kat's brother, and business partner to Mike and Evan, and now Marta
 Lee Tergesen as Mike Tomlin, business partner to Irwin and Evan, and now Marta
 Sterling Beaumon as Gabriel Walraven, Marta's older son
 Jakob Salvati as Boris "Bobo" Walraven, Marta's younger son
 Erin Moriarty as Natalie Walraven, Marta's daughter and middle child
 Suleka Mathew as Dina Tomlin, Mike's wife and Marta's long-time best friend
 Pedro Pascal as Jay Castillo, Katrina's husband, a tattoo artist

Episodes

Reception
Mary McNamara, the Los Angeles Times television critic, called the show's two-hour pilot "high-aspiring but poorly executed"; according to McNamara:

Working from the original Dutch series Penoza, Red Widow is plagued by sanctimony. It wants to have it all: a sympathetic soccer mom heroine suddenly willing and able to do business with murderous thugs....It's easy to see the sort of show [creator Melissa] Rosenberg envisioned, one in which a "normal" woman finds herself juggling the mundane tasks of motherhood with the high-octane exploits required to keep one step in front of a drug lord. But the show is too busy hedging its bets—hey, he was just running pot, not the hard stuff, and she feels sort of guilty about dragging him into it—that it undercuts its own potential power.

DVD releases
Red Widow - The Complete 1st Season was released onto DVD on May 28, 2013 in Region 1.

References

External links
 

2013 American television series debuts
2013 American television series endings
2010s American drama television series
American Broadcasting Company original programming
American television series based on Dutch television series
English-language television shows
Television series about organized crime
Television series by ABC Studios
Television series by Endemol
Television shows set in San Francisco
Television shows filmed in Vancouver
Works about the Russian Mafia